Youcef Benamara (born April 24, 1984 in Guelma, Algeria) is an Algerian football player who plays for ASM Oran in the Algerian Ligue Professionnelle 2.

References

External links
 
 

1984 births
Living people
Algerian footballers
Algerian Ligue Professionnelle 1 players
Algerian Ligue 2 players
CA Batna players
JSM Skikda players
USM Alger players
NA Hussein Dey players
USM Blida players
People from Guelma
Association football defenders
21st-century Algerian people